The 1983–84 Los Angeles Kings season, was the Kings' 17th season in the National Hockey League. It saw the Kings miss the playoffs, finishing fifth in the Smythe Division. It was the last season of the Triple Crown line of Marcel Dionne, Charlie Simmer and Dave Taylor as Simmer would be traded before the next season. All three would be named to the NHL All-Star game.

Offseason

Regular season

Final standings

Schedule and results

Playoffs

Player statistics

Awards and records

Transactions
The Kings were involved in the following transactions during the 1983–84 season.

Trades

Free agent signings

Free agents lost

Waivers

Draft picks
Los Angeles's draft picks at the 1983 NHL Entry Draft held at the Montreal Forum in Montreal, Quebec.

Farm teams

See also
1983–84 NHL season

References

External links

Los Angeles Kings seasons
Los Angeles Kings
Los Angeles Kings
Los Angeles
Los Angeles